Moyenne Island is a small island in the Sainte Anne Marine National Park off the north coast of Mahé, Seychelles. Since the 1970s onwards, it has been a flora and fauna reserve. From 1915 until the 1960s, the island was abandoned until its purchase by Brendon Grimshaw for £8,000 (about 10,000 dollars). He was a newspaper editor from Dewsbury in Yorkshire, England.

Grimshaw was the only inhabitant of the island until his death in July 2012. The island is now a national park and can be visited as part of organized trips.

History

The island's name was derived from the French moyenne, "middle." It was supposedly used by pirates in the 18th and 19th centuries, and contains two graves called pirate graves.

From 1946 to 1962 the island was owned by the late Philippe Georges. He and his wife Vera Georges had lived on the island in the early years and later moved to Mahé where they lived on the property known as Fairview. A view on the island and a beach were named after Vera who spent her days on the property while her husband Philippe worked on Mahe during the day.

Philippe sold the island to Brendon Grimshaw after they had dinner together. Philippe and Vera were very hospitable and invited Brendon to supper when he approached them to buy their island. An agreement was reached after an extended dinner. Grimshaw purchased the island for £8,000 in 1962.

Grimshaw and local youth René Antoine Lafortune planted sixteen thousand trees, built  of nature paths, and brought and bred Aldabra giant tortoises, intending to create an island of extraordinary beauty. Apart from a wide variety of plant and bird life, the island is home to around 120 giant tortoises. In 2012, according to Grimshaw, the eldest was 76, and was named Desmond, after his godson.

In 1996, Grimshaw wrote a book about himself and the island, entitled A Grain of Sand. In 2009, a documentary film was produced about Grimshaw and the island, also called, A Grain of Sand.

After 20 years of persistence, Grimshaw and his assistant Lafortune achieved their goal of making Moyenne Island a national park in its own right, separate from the circumjacent Sainte Anne Marine National Park. The island is now known as the Moyenne Island National Park.

Lafortune died in 2007 and Grimshaw died in Victoria, Mahé, in July 2012.

In 2013, after the island received its own national park status, a new hut was built and a warden was posted on the island, collecting the entrance fee from tourists.

Administration
The island belongs to Mont Fleuri District.

Tourism
Today, the island's main industry is tourism, and it is known for its beaches. Behind the restaurant is the local warden's house.

Image gallery

References

External links 

 
  Moyenne Island Guide

Islands of Mont Fleuri
Private islands of Seychelles
National parks of Seychelles